Sherri Sparling (born 19 March 1969) is a Canadian former rugby union player. 

A long serving captain of the Canada women's national rugby union team, she also participated at the 1998 Women's Rugby World Cup and 2002 Women's Rugby World Cup. She was an honorable mention for the list of the ten greatest North American rugby players.

References 

1969 births
Living people
Canada women's international rugby union players
Canadian female rugby union players